Başar Sabuncu (September 9, 1943 – June 17, 2015) was a Turkish film director, screenwriter, cinematographer and occasional actor.

Early life
Sabuncu started acting when he was a student at the St. Joseph High School.

Filmography

References

External links

 
 [ Başar Sabuncu] at the SinemaTürk

1943 births
2015 deaths
Istanbul University alumni
Film people from Istanbul
Turkish film directors
St. Joseph High School Istanbul alumni